The Pistol Auto 9mm 1A, also known as IOF 9mm pistol, is a semi-automatic pistol manufactured by Rifle Factory Ishapore. It's a licensed copy of the Browning Hi-Power, made using tooling acquired from John Inglis and Company. 

It is the main service pistol of Indian military and police units.

History 
In 1971, preliminary works was established to make Pistol Auto 9mm 1A. The first specimen was manufactured in 1977, while large-scale manufacturing began in 1981.

Design features 
It is a recoil-operated, magazine-fed, self-loading, semi-automatic pistol that uses 9×19mm Parabellum ammunition. The magazine has a 13-round capacity, being based on the original Hi-Power.

It can also be equipped with a suppressor.

Users 
  - Widely used by lower ranking officers of  Indian Armed Forces, Central Armed Police Forces and other Law enforcement agencies as a service weapon.
West Bengal Police - 500.
  - 15,000 with Nepalese Army.

Notes

References

Bibliography

External links
 
 

Handguns of India
India